"Sleep Without You" is a song recorded by American country pop singer Brett Young and co-written by Young, Justin Ebach, and Kelly Archer. Its official release to radio was on April 11, 2016, as the lead single from his debut self-titled album. It has sold 377,000 copies in the United States as of January 2017.

Critical reception
Billy Dukes of Taste of Country gave the song a favorable review, writing that "Young’s R&B influences come out in the sincerity and warmth of his delivery, not the sonic nature of this mostly acoustic jam."

Commercial performance
The song first entered the Country Airplay chart at number 58 for the week of March 5, 2016, and debuted on the Hot Country Songs chart two months later at number 45 on May 14, 2016. It peaked at number three on the chart for the week of December 3, 2016. It also peaked at number two on Billboards Country Airplay chart the following week, beaten by Florida Georgia Line's number one, "May We All". It reached number one on the Mediabase Country chart. It has sold 377,000 copies in the United States as of January 2017. On September 5, 2017, the single was certified platinum by the Recording Industry Association of America (RIAA) for sales of over a million digital copies in the United States.

Music video
The music video was directed by Shane Drake and appeared on CMT, GAC, and Vevo. The music video was filmed in Malibu, California, and co-stars Miss USA 2015 Olivia Jordan.

Charts

Weekly charts

Year-end charts

Certifications

References

2016 debut singles
2016 songs
Brett Young (singer) songs
Republic Nashville singles
Songs written by Kelly Archer
Songs written by Brett Young (singer)
Songs written by Justin Ebach
Song recordings produced by Dann Huff
Music videos directed by Shane Drake